I'm Not the Same Girl is an album by Stacy Lattisaw, released by Cotillion Records in 1985. All tracks were written and produced by Michael Masser.

The album feature covers of two Masser songs previously recorded by Diana Ross, "I Thought It Took a Little Time" and "Together" - as well as a version of "Now We're Starting Over Again" originally cut by Dionne Warwick.

It was later re-released by Wounded Bird Records on compact disc.

Track listing

"Can't Stop Thinking About You"	4:10
"Coming Alive"	3:02
"Now We're Starting Over Again"	3:40
"He's Just Not You"	3:23
"I'm Not the Same Girl"	3:50
"Toughen Up"	2:18
"Together"	3:37
"I Thought It Took a Little Time"	3:09

References

External links
I'm Not the Same Girl by Stacy Lattisaw at MusicBrainz
I'm Not the Same Girl by Stacy Lattisaw at Discogs

1985 albums
Stacy Lattisaw albums
albums produced by Michael Masser
Cotillion Records albums